Elections were held in Bruce County, Ontario on October 24, 2022, in conjunction with municipal elections across the province.

Bruce County Council
Bruce County Council consists of the mayors of the constituent municipalities.

Arran-Elderslie
Steve Hammell has been re-elected mayor of Arran-Elderslie by acclamation.

Brockton
Christopher Peabody was re-elected as mayor of Brockton by acclamation.

Huron-Kinloss
Incumbent mayor Mitch Twolan did not run for re-election. Deputy mayor Don Murray, Roxy Bergman and Angela Thompkins ran to replace him.

Kincardine
The following were the results for mayor of Kincardine.

Northern Bruce Peninsula
Milt McIver, who has been mayor of the municipality since its creation in 1999, and the reeve of Lindsay Township for 17 years prior to that, was challenged by Karen Phillips.

Saugeen Shores
Luke Charbonneau was re-elected as mayor of Saugeen Shores by acclamation.

South Bruce
The following were the results for mayor of South Bruce.

South Bruce Peninsula
The following were the results for mayor of South Bruce Peninsula.

References

Bruce County
Bruce